Tell Qasile is an archaeological site near the Yarkon River in Tel Aviv, Israel. Over 3,000 years old, the site contains the remains of a port city founded by the Philistines in the 12th century BC. 

Prior to 1948, it was on the village lands of Al-Shaykh Muwannis, which was depopulated in the 1948 war. While the war was still ongoing, in late 1948, the site was given the first archaeological permit by the newly-declared of state of Israel. Today it is located on the grounds of the Eretz Israel Museum, which was built in 1953.

Prior to these first excavations, two important ostraca were discovered at the site in 1945-96, by Jacob Kaplan and Robert Hoff.

History

In 1815, after excavating the ruins of ancient Ashkelon, Lady Hester Stanhope proposed a dig at a site called el-Khurby located 12 miles northeast of Jaffa on the banks of the Awgy River (today the Yarkon River). Stanhope's companion observed that “there were many proofs that this district was once highly populous.”

Benjamin Mazar received the first archaeological exploration permit issued by the state of Israel to excavate there in 1948. He directed subsequent excavation at the site in 1971 to 1974 and again from 1982 to 1990. The excavations revealed the gradual development of the Philistine city over 150 years, from its founding (Level XII) to the peak of its growth (Level X) at the end of the 11th century BC.

Archaeological findings
The sacred area of the Philistine city was unearthed to reveal three temples, built one on top of the other. The temples were constructed with walls of sun-dried mud bricks covered with light-colored plaster. Low benches were built along the length of the walls. Many offering and cult vessels were found on the floors, concentrated mainly around the "bamah" and in the storage alcoves of the temples. A residential block was found on the north side of the street, while in the south side workshops and storehouses were unearthed. The houses were built to a standard plan - they were square, with an area of approximately 100 square meters per apartment. Each apartment comprised two rectangular rooms with a courtyard separating them.

Islamic Khan
Excavations in the 1980s revealed a large courtyard building, dating from the Abbasid era. The building has been dated by its excavators to a period between the ninth and eleventh century, though both earlier (Umayyad) and later (Crusader) occupations of the site were found.
The design of the building and its position (at a river crossing point), indicate that it was a khan.

Only the northern part of the building was excavated, the rest only visible as robber trenches. From the excavated parts, it is estimated that the building was 28 meters square. A paved entrance in the middle of the north wall led to a courtyard, paved with gravel. The courtyard had arcades on the east and west sides, supported by columns. In the north-west corner of the courtyard were the remains of a staircase. Several small rooms, lining the courtyard, were exposed.

References

Bibliography
Ayalon, E., Gilboa, E., and Shacham, T.(1986–1987): "A Public Building of the Early Arab period at Tell Qasile", IPL, 4 (22), pp. 35–52 (Hebrew with English summary on pp. 7–8).
Amihai Mazar, "Excavations at Tell Qasile: Part I. The Philistine sanctuary: architecture and cult objects (Qedem)", Institute of Archaeology, Hebrew University of Jerusalem, 1980
Amihai Mazar, "Excavations at Tell Qasile: Part Two: The Philistine Sanctuary: Various Finds, the Pottery, Conclusions, Appendixes", Institute of Archaeology, Hebrew University of Jerusalem, 1985
 Mazar, A. (1988–1989): "Tel Qasila - 1986-1987", ESI 7-8, p. 147-148.

External links

Link to the site of Prof. Amihai Mazar, regarding Tell Qasile
Philistine facts on the ground, by Yaacov Shavit, Haaretz
Tell Qasile Final Report, by Etan Ayalon and Semadar Harpazi Ofer, 7/6/2004,  Hadashot Arkheologiyot – Excavations and Surveys in Israel,   #116
Tell Qasile Final Report, by Etan Ayalon, 23/7/2007,  Hadashot Arkheologiyot – Excavations and Surveys in Israel, #119
Tell Qasile Final Report, by Alexander Glick, 13/1/2008, Hadashot Arkheologiyot – Excavations and Surveys in Israel,  #120		
Tell Qasile Final Report, by Etan Ayalon and Nitza Bashkin-Yosef, 29/5/2008,  Hadashot Arkheologiyot – Excavations and Surveys in Israel,  #120
Tell Qasile (West) Final Report, by Alexander Glick, 14/2/2009,  Hadashot Arkheologiyot – Excavations and Surveys in Israel,  #121
Tell Qasile (West) Final Report, by Alexander Glick, 13/10/2009, Hadashot Arkheologiyot – Excavations and Surveys in Israel,  #121
Tell Qasile (West) Final Report, by Alexander Glick, 28/12/2009, Hadashot Arkheologiyot – Excavations and Surveys in Israel,  #121

Populated places established in the 2nd millennium BC
Archaeological sites in Israel
Philistines
Former populated places in Southwest Asia